Rucentra dammermani is a species of beetle in the family Cerambycidae. It was described by Schwarzer in 1931. It is known from Java.

References

Apomecynini
Beetles described in 1931